Ectoedemia decentella is a moth of the  family Nepticulidae found in Europe. It was described in 1855, by the German entomologist and physician, Gottlieb August Wilhelm Herrich-Schäffer.

Description
The wingspan is 5–81 mm. There are two generations per year, with adults on wing in June and again in August.

The larvae feed on field maple (Acer campestre), Montpellier maple (Acer monspessulanum), Acer obtusatum, sycamore (Acer pseudoplatanus) and Cretan maple ((Acer sempervirens). The larvae of the first generation live in the flower buds, and larva of the second generation make a corridor in the wing of the key. Pupation takes place outside of the mine.

Distribution
It is found from Sweden to the Iberian Peninsula, the Alps and Greece, and from Great Britain to the Ukraine.

References

Nepticulidae
Leaf miners
Moths described in 1855
Moths of Europe
Taxa named by Gottlieb August Wilhelm Herrich-Schäffer